Mammoth Cave is a lava tube located on the Markagunt Plateau in the Dixie National Forest of Southern Utah, and is one of the largest lava tubes in Utah. The cave has over 2,200 feet (670 m) of passage and is about a quarter mile (400 m) long. It was formed by cooling lava and water less than 2,000 years ago. Due to moisture and its elevation of 8,050 feet (2,450 m) above sea level the cave stays cool year round.

The cave has four chambers, the largest to the west. At the end of the largest tunnel, it narrows to a small opening that can be used as an exit. Although the cave is open year round, portions of it are closed off from October until April to protect hibernating bats.  Additionally, Mammoth Creek Road may be completely impassable during the winter months due to snowfall.

Sources 
US Forest Service
Cedar City Brian Head Tourist Bureau

Caves of Utah
Landforms of Garfield County, Utah
Protected areas of Garfield County, Utah
Dixie National Forest
Show caves in the United States
Lava tubes